Tillandsia lampropoda is a species of flowering plant in the genus Tillandsia. This species is native to Central America and southern Mexico, from Oaxaca to Panama.

Cultivars
 Tillandsia 'El Primo'
 Tillandsia 'Sentry'
 × Vrieslandsia 'Red Beacon'

References

lampropoda
Flora of Central America
Flora of Oaxaca
Flora of Chiapas
Plants described in 1938